The most common bone tumor is called osteosarcoma, and typically affects middle-age to older dogs of large and giant breeds. Osteosarcoma is less common in cats. Osteosarcoma is an aggressive cancer that can develop in any bone of the body but the majority is seen in the limbs (e.g. long bones such as radius, humerus, femur, and tibia).

Signs and symptoms
Dogs with limb osteosarcoma typically show lameness and swelling at the affected site. For other sites, dogs may show difficulty to open their mouth (if jaw bone cancer), nasal discharge (if nasal cavity bone cancer) or neurological signs (if spine bone cancer).

Diagnosis
The initial evaluation involves radiographs (X-rays) of the affected site, but the only way to confirm the diagnosis is by sampling the tissue via biopsy or needle aspiration.

Treatment
Depending on the pet's unique condition, there are several treatment options, including surgery, chemotherapy and radiation therapy. Treating the pain adequately is also of crucial importance to improve the pet's quality of life, especially if amputation is not performed.

References

External links
 Bone Cancer in Cats and Dogs from Pet Cancer Center
Canine osteosarcoma from UGA Veterinary School of Medicine'
Osteosarcoma from Animal Cancer & Imaging Center
Canine Osteosarcoma from Davies Veterinary Specialists
Bone Cancer Pain in Dogs: New Ideas from Dr. Demian Drsssler, DVM of Dog Cancer Blog'

Cancer in dogs
Cancer in cats
Types of animal cancers
Osseous and chondromatous neoplasia